Harutaeographa yangzisherpani is a moth of the family Noctuidae. It is found in Nepal and northern Vietnam.

References

Moths described in 1999
Orthosiini